Team Spirit is a Russian esports organization based in Moscow. Founded in 2015, the organization currently has teams competing in Counter-Strike: Global Offensive, Dota 2, League of Legends and Hearthstone. Their Dota 2 squad won The International 2021 and received the largest single prize money payout in esports history at $18 million.

On 24 March 2022 Spirit announced the opening of an additional office in Belgrade.

Divisions

Counter-Strike: Global Offensive 
On 9 June 2016, the organization signed the members of Team Phenomenon. On 3 March 2019, Artem "iDISBALANCE" Yegorov and Leonid "chopper" Vishnyakov joined the team. On 9 September 2019, Pavel "COLDYY1" Veklenko and Dmitriy "SotF1k" Forostyanko were removed from the squad. They were replaced by Nikolai "mir" Bityukov from Gambit Esports and 17-year-old Boris "magixx" Vorobyov from the ESPADA team.

Roster

Dota 2 
The organisation signed its first team in Dota 2 by acquiring CIS Rejects in December 2015. On 19 December 2020, the team signed the roster of Yellow Submarine. In October 2021, Team Spirit defeated PSG.LGD in the Grand Finals of The International 2021 and won a total of 18,208,300, the largest purse ever awarded in esports. They were the first Eastern European team to win an International since Natus Vincere in the inaugural International in 2011.

League of Legends 

Spirit entered the League of Legends competitive scene on 31 January 2022 by signing young players Dreampull, Griffon and Mytant, as well as the legends of CIS LoL competitive scene: Diamondprox and Edward.

Hearthstone 
On 6 October 2016, Team Spirit opened its Hearthstone division by signing SilverName, ShtanUdachi, Iner, and NickChipper. In 2020, Silvername achieved 3rd place at the Hearthstone World Championship.

Former divisions 
Team Spirit had a PlayerUnknown's Battlegrounds division from 2017 until 2019.

References

External links 
  

Dota teams
Counter-Strike teams
Esports teams based in Russia
Hearthstone teams
2015 establishments in Russia
Esports teams established in 2015